Lone Pine Barracks is an Australian Army base located in New South Wales,  south of Singleton.  The barracks is home to the Australian Army School of Infantry, Special Forces Training Centre, Defence Support Group Singleton and other regular support services. The Royal Australian Infantry Corps Museum is also located within the barracks.

See also
 List of Australian military bases

References
Leading Defence in the Hunter
 Infantry musem

Barracks in Australia
Military establishments in the Hunter Region
Singleton Council